Bald Mountain, located in the Upper Peninsula of Michigan, is one of several bare rock summits of the Huron Mountain range. It is on the border of Marquette County and Baraga County, but most of the summit resides in Marquette County.

Bald Mountain is an outlier of the Huron Mountain range, as it is farther west than most of the other rocky summits. Other outliers on the opposite, eastern side of the range include Hogsback Mountain and Sugarloaf Mountain. It is currently privately owned, but is administered under the CFA program. The surrounding area is being actively logged in 2017.

See also

Outline of Michigan
Index of Michigan-related articles
List of U.S. states by elevation

References

External links

Mountains of Michigan
Landforms of Baraga County, Michigan